James Todd Newton (born May 5, 1970) is an American entertainment reporter, game show host, and author.

Career

Newton started his entertainment career at age sixteen as a disc jockey for Kincaid Entertainment in St. Louis.  Later, the company found a role for him on its popular KMOV children's television show Gator Tales.

While visiting Los Angeles in 1994 to host a movie junket for St. Louis television station KPLR, Newton — then a top-rated radio personality known as Rikk Idol — used the last of his travel money to hire a taxi to take him to the offices of various agents around Hollywood. He eventually signed with Abrams, Rubaloff, & Lawrence and was tapped as a host on E! Entertainment Television in 1995.

Newton was presented with the Daytime Emmy Award for Outstanding Game Show Host in 2012 for his work on Hasbro Studios' popular Family Game Night. He later hosted the syndicated Monopoly Millionaires' Club alongside comic Billy Gardell.

Mentored by game show pioneers Sande Stewart and Bob Barker, Newton has also been at the helm of such productions as The Price Is Right Live!, GSN's Hollywood Showdown, Powerball Instant Millionaire, In Search Of The Partridge Family, World's Wildest Game Shows, and Whammy! The All-New Press Your Luck.

The Host With The Most has awarded game show contestants more than sixty million dollars in cash and prizes. He currently hosts The Tattooed Traveler YouTube channel  and the syndicated radio program The Todd Newton Morning Show with Maria Todd. The daily talk and music show can be heard on radio stations across the country..

Television credits
Gator Tales (1986)
E! (1995–2007)
Hollywood Showdown (2000–2001)
Whammy! The All-New Press Your Luck (2002–2003)
Powerball Instant Millionaire (2002–2004)
Hot Ticket (2003)
Performing As... (2004)
Reality Remix (2004–2006)
Made in the USA (2005)
Gameshow Marathon (2006, road reporter and prize presenter)
Home Shopping Network (2007–2008)
GSN Live (2009)
Family Game Night (2010–2014)
Monopoly Millionaires' Club (2015–2016, Co-host)
ShopHQ (2018–2020)

Radio

Todd Newton has been behind the microphone of various American radio stations including WKBQ in his hometown of St. Louis, KIIS and KBIG in Los Angeles, WNEW in New York, and the syndicated All Nite Cafe. In January 2015, he helped launch a new radio station in St. Louis called NOW 96.3 KNOU and was inducted into the St. Louis Media Hall of Fame. He is currently the host of The Host With The Most podcast and The Todd Newton Morning Show with Maria Todd.

Author
In 2012, Newton authored his first book, Life in the Bonus Round.  The following year he penned Create A Superstar Demo, and in 2016, The Host With The Most: Tales Of A Tattooed Television Personality.

References

External links
 

1970 births
American game show hosts
American infotainers
Living people
People from St. Louis County, Missouri
Daytime Emmy Award for Outstanding Game Show Host winners